SLAF Mirigama  is the Sri Lanka Air Force radar station in Mirigama. It provides air surveillance and early warning and is home to the No 4 Air Defence Radar Squadron. A Chinese JY-11 Radar low/medium altitude 3D surveillance radar has been installed since 2008 as part of the National Air Defence System of Sri Lanka.

References

External links
 SLAF Mirigama
 Annual Commanders Inspection – Mirigama

Sri Lanka Air Force bases
Buildings and structures in Mirigama